This is a list of public art in Birmingham, Alabama, in the United States. This list applies only to works of public art on permanent display in an outdoor public space. For example, this does not include artworks in museums. Public art may include sculptures, statues, monuments, memorials, murals, and mosaics.

Public art
Birmingham, Alabama
Birmingham
Public art
Public art